Randolph Daniel Moss (born April 27, 1961) is a United States district judge of the United States District Court for the District of Columbia.

Biography

Moss was born Raymond Daniel Moss in Springfield, Ohio. He received an Artium Baccalaureus degree, summa cum laude, in 1983 from Hamilton College. He received a Juris Doctor in 1986 from Yale Law School. He began his legal career as a law clerk to Judge Pierre N. Leval of the United States District Court for the Southern District of New York, from 1986 to 1987, and then served as a law clerk to Justice John Paul Stevens of the United States Supreme Court, from 1988 to 1989. He worked at the law firm of Wilmer, Cutler & Pickering from 1989 to 1996. From 1996 to 2001, he worked at the United States Department of Justice, Office of Legal Counsel, in a number of capacities. He served as Deputy Assistant Attorney General, from 1996 to 1998, Acting Assistant Attorney General, from 1998 to 2000, and as Assistant Attorney General, from 2000 to 2001. After his service in the Justice Department, he returned to his previous law firm, now known as Wilmer, Cutler, Pickering, Hale and Dorr LLP, where he chaired the firm's Regulatory and Government Affairs Department, leaving the firm upon his confirmation as a federal judge in November 2014.

Federal agency service

In 2000, when Moss was an Assistant Attorney General in the Office of Legal Counsel (OLC) of the United States Department of Justice, he wrote the memorandum opinion advising that the Department could not indict a sitting president. "The indictment or criminal prosecution of a sitting President would unconstitutionally undermine the capacity of the executive branch to perform its constitutionally assigned functions."

The Mueller Report (March 2019, Vol. II, p. 1) cited the Moss memorandum in partial justification of Special Counsel  Robert Mueller's decision not to indict  President Donald Trump. "Given the role of the Special Counsel as an attorney in the Department of Justice and the framework of the Special Counsel regulations, see 28 U.S.C. § 515; 28 C.F.R. § 600.7(a), this Office accepted OLC's legal conclusion for the purpose of exercising prosecutorial jurisdiction."

Federal judicial service

On April 3, 2014, President Barack Obama nominated Moss to serve as a United States District Judge of the United States District Court for the District of Columbia, to the seat vacated by Judge Robert L. Wilkins, who was elevated to the United States Court of Appeals for the District of Columbia Circuit. He received a hearing before the United States Senate Judiciary Committee on May 20, 2014. On June 19, 2014 his nomination was reported out of committee by a 11–7 vote. On September 18, 2014 Senate Majority Leader Harry Reid filed for cloture on his nomination. On Wednesday, November 12, 2014, the Senate invoked cloture on his nomination by a 53–45 vote. On November 13, 2014, his nomination was confirmed by a 54–45 vote. He received his judicial commission on November 14, 2014.

Notable rulings

In May 2016, Moss found that the Foreign Sovereign Immunities Act prevented an Ethiopian dissident living under asylum in the United States from suing the Ethiopian government for infecting his home computer with FinSpy spyware and then surveilling him in Maryland.

On October 16, 2018, Moss ruled against Education Secretary Betsy DeVos after she stopped an Obama-era rule from taking effect which protected students against fraud from for-profit colleges.

On March 1, 2020, Moss ruled that President Donald Trump unlawfully installed Ken Cuccinelli as acting Director of the United States Citizenship and Immigration Services (USCIS) and that therefore, certain directives related to removal of undocumented immigrants seeking asylum he implemented “must be set aside.”

On December 26, 2020, Moss ruled that the United States Justice Department unlawfully rescheduled the execution of Lisa Montgomery, the only woman on federal death row.  On January 1, 2021, a three judge panel of the United States Court of Appeals for the District of Columbia Circuit vacated Moss's ruling.

On July 19, 2021, Moss sentenced Paul Hodgkins, a Florida man who participated in the 2021 United States Capitol attack to eight months in prison. Moss acknowledged that this man was part of a larger mob, but said that "Although you were only one member of a larger mob, you actively participated in a larger event that threatened the Capitol and democracy itself". At the time of his sentencing, Hodgkins is the third person to be sentenced for their participation at the insurrection, and his sentence is the longest thus far.

See also 
 List of law clerks of the Supreme Court of the United States (Seat 4)

References

External links

1961 births
Living people
Hamilton College (New York) alumni
Judges of the United States District Court for the District of Columbia
Law clerks of the Supreme Court of the United States
Maryland lawyers
New York (state) lawyers
People from Springfield, Ohio
United States Assistant Attorneys General for the Office of Legal Counsel
United States Department of Justice lawyers
United States district court judges appointed by Barack Obama
Lawyers from Washington, D.C.
Yale Law School alumni
21st-century American judges
Wilmer Cutler Pickering Hale and Dorr people